

The Beatles Story is a museum in Liverpool about the Beatles and their history. It is located on the historical Royal Albert Dock, and is owned by Mersey Ferries, part of Merseytravel.
The Beatles Story contains recreations of The Casbah Coffee Club, The Cavern Club and Abbey Road Studios among other historical Beatles items, such as John Lennon's spectacles, George Harrison's first guitar and a detailed history about the British Invasion and the solo careers of every Beatle. The museum was also recognised as one of the best tourist attractions of the United Kingdom in 2015. The exhibition was preceded by the Cavern Mecca (1981-1984) and Beatles City (1984-1986).

Gallery

See also 
 Liverpool Beatles Museum
Cavern Mecca
 List of music museums

References

External links

Museums established in 1990
Tourist attractions in Liverpool
Cultural depictions of the Beatles
Music museums in Liverpool
Biographical museums in Merseyside
Rock music museums
1990 establishments in England